Presidential elections were held in Transnistria on 11 December 2016. The result was a victory for Supreme Council Speaker, Vadim Krasnoselsky, who defeated incumbent President Yevgeny Shevchuk.

Candidates
Seven candidates registered to contest the elections. However, former Interior Minister Gennady Kuzmichev later withdrew their candidacy.

Results

References

Transnistria
Elections in Transnistria
2016 in Transnistria
Election and referendum articles with incomplete results